Lee Byeong-yong (born 11 May 1971) is a South Korean volleyball player. He competed in the men's tournament at the 2000 Summer Olympics.

References

1971 births
Living people
South Korean men's volleyball players
Olympic volleyball players of South Korea
Volleyball players at the 2000 Summer Olympics
Place of birth missing (living people)